Robert E. Tranquada (1930 – December 4, 2022) was an American doctor and academic administrator. He was dean of the University of Massachusetts Medical School from 1979 to 1986, and of the University of Southern California School of Medicine from 1986 to 1991.

Early life
Tranquada graduated from Pomona College in 1951, and earned his medical degree from the Stanford University School of Medicine in 1955.

Career
Tranquada was dean of the University of Massachusetts Medical School from 1979 to 1986, and of the University of Southern California School of Medicine from 1986 to 1991. He was also president of the Pomona board of trustees starting in 1991.

References

1930 births
2022 deaths
Stanford University School of Medicine alumni
American academic administrators
Pomona College alumni
University of Massachusetts Medical School faculty
University of Southern California faculty
Pomona College trustees
Members of the National Academy of Medicine
Fellows of the American Association for the Advancement of Science